Courtney O'Connor (born 12 August 1960) is a Jamaican cricketer. He played in three first-class and two List A matches for the Jamaican cricket team in 1986/87 and 1987/88.

See also
 List of Jamaican representative cricketers

References

External links
 

1960 births
Living people
Jamaican cricketers
Jamaica cricketers
Sportspeople from Kingston, Jamaica